JOGV-FM, branding , is a Japanese radio station based in Chiba City, Chiba, Japan with its main frequency at 78.0 MHz. It also broadcasts on 87.4 MHz in Katsuura, 79.3 MHz in Choshi, 79.7 MHz in Shirahama & 77.7 MHz in Tateyama.

Rebroadcasters

References

External links
 

Radio stations in Japan
Companies based in Chiba Prefecture
Mass media in Chiba (city)
Radio stations established in 1989